Sir James Pickering (died c. 1398) was Speaker of the House of Commons of England in 1378 (which met in Gloucester) and again from 1382 to 1383. The protestation which, as Speaker, he made for freedom of speech, and declaring the loyalty of the Commons, was the first recorded in the rolls.

He was descended from the knightly Pickering family of Killington, then in  Westmorland, son of Thomas Pickering (1310-1375) and Elizabeth Greystoke (1300-1370), and was married to Alice Ellerton. He owned land at Killington in Westmorland and Selby in Yorkshire and was knighted by 1361.

He was knight of the shire for Westmorland in 1362, 1365, 1377–1379 and 1382 and Cumberland in 1368. On 20 December 1368 he was commissioner of array in Westmorland, to choose twenty archers to serve under Sir William Windsor in Ireland, in his position of Chief justice of Ireland, in order, it has been said, to implement 'some highly dubious financial practices.' He served as MP for Yorkshire in 1383, 1384, 1388 and 1390, Sheriff of Yorkshire for 1389, 1393 and 1397 and MP for Yorkshire for the last time in September 1397.

See also
List of speakers of the House of Commons of England

Notes

14th-century births
1390s deaths
Year of birth unknown
Year of death uncertain
Speakers of the House of Commons of England
High Sheriffs of Yorkshire
English MPs 1362
English MPs 1365
English MPs 1368
English MPs October 1377
English MPs 1378
English MPs 1379
English MPs October 1382
English MPs February 1383
English MPs November 1384
English MPs September 1388
English MPs November 1390
English MPs September 1397
English knights